The Registan–North Pakistan sandy desert ecoregion (WWF ID: PA1326) covers the dry Sistan Basin of southern Afghanistan and portions of eastern Iran and southwest Pakistan.  The Registan Desert is the eastern portion of the Sistan Basin.  The region is almost entirely dry sandy desert, with some irrigated cropland along the rivers.  There are some seasonal wetlands at the western terminus of the Helmand River into Hamun Lake.  The region support five endemic species of reptiles.

Location and description 
The ecoregion basin is about 500 km across, surrounded by mountains. The Helmand River flows through the desert from the northeast (at Kandahar) to the southwest, where it empties into the endorheic (no outlet to the sea) Hamun Lake. There are three distinct deserts in the basin - the Dasht-e Margo, the Registan desert, and the Dasht-e Khash.

To the north are the Central Mountain ranges of Afghanistan, which are themselves the western extensions of the Hindu Kush Mountains. To the east are the Sulaiman Mountains of Pakistan, to the south the Central Makran Range in Pakistan, and to the west the Central Persian desert basins region. Across the middle run the granite Chagai Hills along the Afghan-Pakistan border.

Climate 
The climate of the ecoregion is Cold desert climate (Köppen climate classification (BWk)). This climate features hot desert conditions in the summer, but cooler than hot deserts.   Winters are cold and dry.  At least one month averages below .

Flora and fauna 
The basin is one of the driest regions on earth; 95% of the territory is bare or sparse vegetation.  4% of the land is cultivated, being irrigated on fertile land along the main rivers - the Helmand River, the Farah River, and the Khash River.

Species richness is fairly high for a desert, with 391 species of vertebrates.  But the only endemic species are a small number of reptiles: the Afghan toadhead agama (Phrynocephalus clarkorum), Missone's gecko (Rhinogekko misonnei), the Point-snouted racerunner (Eremias acutirostris) (a lizard), and the Dark head dwarf-racer (Eirenis mcmahoni).

Protected areas 
Less than 2% of the ecoregion is officially protected.  These protected areas include:
 Hamun Lake
 Ras Koh Wildlife Sanctuary

References 

Palearctic ecoregions
Deserts and xeric shrublands
Ecoregions of Afghanistan
Ecoregions of Iran
Ecoregions of Pakistan